The Vorya is a river that flows through the Moscow and Smolensk Oblasts in Russia.

References 

Rivers of Moscow Oblast
Rivers of Smolensk Oblast